GamePigeon is a mobile app for iOS devices, developed by Vitalii Zlotskii and released on September 13, 2016. The game takes advantage of the iOS 10 update, which expanded how users could interact with Apple's Messages app. GamePigeon is only available through the Messages app, which allows players to start and respond to different party games in conversations.

Release
The app was first released on September 13, 2016, coinciding with the launch of iOS 10. The app was released for free, although it includes in-app purchases to unlock additional items, such as cosmetic skins, avatar items, new game modes, and an option to remove ads.

Games in the app
The following is a list of games which users can play within GamePigeon:

8 Ball
9 Ball
20 Questions
Archery
Basketball
Checkers
Chess
Crazy 8
Cup Pong

Darts
Dots & Boxes
Filler
Four In A Row
Gomoku
Knockout
Mancala
Miniature Golf
Paintball

Reversi
Sea Battle
Shuffleboard
Tanks
Word Games
Anagrams
Word Bites
Word Hunt

Sources:

Poker was one of the games included in GamePigeon at launch, although it has since been removed and is no longer listed on the game's App Store description.

Reception
GamePigeon has enjoyed commercial success, with VentureBeat noting that GamePigeon was ranked number-one in the "Top Free" category of the iMessage App Store, six months after its release. Critically, GamePigeon has been generally well received, being highlighted by online media publications early on shortly after the iOS 10 launch. It has since been included on many "best iMessage apps" lists. Based on over 162,000 ratings, the game holds a 4.0 out of 5 rating on the App Store. Julian Chokkattu of Digital Trends wrote "GamePigeon should be like the pre-installed versions of Solitaire and Minesweeper that used to come with older iterations of Windows." On its launch day, Boy Genius Report included it on a list of "10 of the best iMessage apps, games and stickers for iOS 10 on launch day." The Daily Dot wrote, "GamePigeon is easily the best current gaming option within iMessages."

8-Ball and Cup Pong have been particularly well received by media outlets. The Daily Dot had specific praise for the app's billiards game: "8-Ball controls shockingly smoothly with your fingers, and there’s nothing quite like destroying a dear friend in poker." During his 2020 U.S. presidential campaign, Cory Booker was cited as playing the game with his family.

In 2017, CNBC cited one teenager who expressed that GamePigeon was one of just a few reasons that those in her age range use the iMessage app. The game has received particular positive reception for allowing introverted individuals to exercise a form social activity; similarly, the game was highlighted as a way to maintain social distancing guidelines during the COVID-19 pandemic.

Influence
Snapchat released an in-message games app called Snapchat Games.

As an April Fools' Day joke, The Chronicle, a Duke University newspaper, published that Duke's athletic program adopted Cup Pong as an official varsity sport.

References

2016 software
Mobile applications
IOS-only games
IOS games